Wojciech Makowski (born 19 February 1992) is a Polish Paralympic swimmer. He represented Poland at the 2016 Summer Paralympics held in Rio de Janeiro, Brazil and he won the silver medal in the men's 100 metre backstroke S11 event. He also competed at the 2020 Summer Paralympics held in Tokyo, Japan.

At the 2018 World Para Swimming European Championships held in Dublin, Ireland, he won the silver medals in the men's 100 metres backstroke S11 and men's 100 metres freestyle S11 events. He also won the bronze medal in the men's 50 metres freestyle S11 event.

References

External links 
 

1992 births
Living people
Polish male backstroke swimmers
Polish male freestyle swimmers
Paralympic swimmers of Poland
Paralympic swimmers with a vision impairment
Paralympic silver medalists for Poland
Paralympic medalists in swimming
Swimmers at the 2016 Summer Paralympics
Swimmers at the 2020 Summer Paralympics
Medalists at the 2016 Summer Paralympics
Medalists at the World Para Swimming European Championships
Place of birth missing (living people)
S11-classified Paralympic swimmers
21st-century Polish people
Polish blind people